John Oladipo Oladitan (28 November 1930 – 17 June 2002) was a Nigerian athlete. He competed in the men's long jump at the 1960 Summer Olympics.

References

External links

1930 births
2002 deaths
Athletes (track and field) at the 1960 Summer Olympics
Nigerian male long jumpers
Olympic athletes of Nigeria